Crenicichla marmorata is a species of cichlid native to South America. It is found in the Amazon River basin, only in the southern tributaries of the Amazon River in Brazil, from the Madeira River to the Tocantins River.

References

marmorata
Freshwater fish of Brazil
Fish of the Amazon basin
Taxa named by Jacques Pellegrin
Fish described in 1904